Frederick Adams Wells (October 13, 1857 – March 12, 1926) was an American businessman and politician from New York.

Personal life
Wells was born in Brooklyn, Kings County, New York on October 13, 1857, the son of James Wells (1828–1888), a federal revenue assessor, and his wife, Althea Maria Gantz (ca 1837–1914). Samuel Adams, a signer of the Declaration of Independence, was a great-great-grandfather. Wells was educated in the public and private schools of Brooklyn.

Frederick Wells married (1st) in 1884 Ada Cynthia Gallagher (1862–1896), with whom he had a son, William Henson Wells (1886–1958). He married (2nd) in 1902 Ida Von Hofe.

In 1899, Wells was "president and treasurer of the Frederick A. Wells Co., manufacturers". In 1916, he was "engaged in the importing business". In 1920 he was employed as a cigar salesman.

Wells died on March 12, 1926, in St. Petersburg, Florida, and was buried at the Green-Wood Cemetery in Brooklyn.

Military and political career
Wells was active in the New York State Militia. During World War I he was commissioned a major of the U.S. Army, but resigned his commission in 1916 in order to be eligible to run for a seat in the New York State Assembly.

Wells was a member of the Republican Party. He won election to the New York State Assembly (Kings County, 17th District) in 1915, 1916, 1917, 1918, 1919, 1920, 1921 and 1922. He was Chairman of the Committee on Military Affairs from 1918 to 1922. Wells was defeated in the elections of 1922 and 23 by Julius Ruger, a Democrat.

See also

John Witt Randall, art collector, Frederick Wells’ first cousin once removed. 
Webster Wells, mathematician, Frederick Wells’ second cousin. 
Joseph Morrill Wells, architect, Frederick Wells’ second cousin.

References

External links

1857 births
1926 deaths
Politicians from Brooklyn
Republican Party members of the New York State Assembly
Burials at Green-Wood Cemetery
Descendants of Samuel Adams